Abdullah Ghofoor was a citizen of Afghanistan who was held in the United States Guantanamo Bay detainment camps, in Cuba.
American counter-terrorism analysts estimate he was born in 1971, in Keshai, Afghanistan.

He arrived in Guantanamo on June 10, 2002, and was repatriated to Afghanistan on March 14, 2004.

Repatriation

On November 25, 2009, the Department of Defense published a list of the dates captives were transferred from Guantanamo.
According to that list Abdullah Ghofoor
was transferred on March 14, 2004.

Suspected of having become a Taliban leader after his release

The Defense Intelligence Agency suspected that Ghoffor had become a Taliban leader after his release from Guantanamo. It stated that Ghofoor was eventually killed in a raid but did not say when he was killed.

References

External links
 WikiLeaks: The Unknown Prisoners of Guantánamo (Part Two of Five) Andy Worthington

Guantanamo detainees known to have been released
1971 births
Possibly living people